Geležinis Vilkas means "iron wolf" in Lithuanian and may refer to:

Iron Wolf (character), from the medieval foundation legend of the city of Vilnius
RK Geležinis Vilkas
FK Geležinis Vilkas
Geležinis Vilkas, children football academy
 Mechanised Infantry Brigade Iron Wolf, a unit of the Lithuanian Army
Iron Wolf (organization), was a Lithuanian fascist movement formed in 1927